Somerset County may refer to:

Australia 
 the former name of Somerset Land District, Tasmania
 Somerset Region in Queensland

United Kingdom 

 Somerset, England

United States 

 Somerset County, Maine
 Somerset County, Maryland
 Somerset County, New Jersey, the most populous county in the United States named Somerset
 Somerset County, Pennsylvania

County name disambiguation pages